WPRO may refer to:

 WPRO (AM), a radio station (630 kHz) licensed to Providence, Rhode Island, United States
 WPRO-FM, a radio station (92.3 MHz) licensed to Providence
 WPRI-TV, a television station (channel 12) licensed to Providence, which held the call sign WPRO-TV until 1967
 the World Health Organization's Regional Office for Western Pacific